The Leiden International Film Festival (LIFF) is a film festival based in the Netherlands. The Leiden International Film Festival was founded in 2006 by Alexander Mouret, Michaël Roumen, Michel Zorge, Wouter de Bres and Job Zeestraten. The festival's main competition is American Indie Competition LIFF which screens films from American filmmakers.

Program
The festival's programming consists of many different kinds of fiction films, including both mainstream and arthouse films. During the festival, films are not only screened in cinemas but special screenings are also hosted at venues like museums, an old factory, a historic church and an observatory.

American Independent Cinema and the American Indie Competition
Although the festival is based in Leiden, it is an international film festival which has focused on American independent cinema, resulting in the American Indie Competition. The American Indie Competition is the festival's main competition, focusing entirely on American independent cinema. Winners of previous competitions include (Untitled) and Safety Not Guaranteed. The prize is not awarded by a jury, but is voted for by all visitors of the selected films.

Some American indies that were screened in the Netherlands at the festival: Breaking Upwards, (Untitled), Safety Not Guaranteed, Howl, Towelhead, Winter's Bone, Please Give, Lola Versus, Precious, Little Miss Sunshine, Short Term 12, Whiplash, Tangerine, Me and Earl and the Dying Girl and Swiss Army Man.

2013 American Indie Competition
On September 28, the lineup for the 2013 American Indie Competition was announced by Filmmaker Magazine. Films that will be screening are: Ain't Them Bodies Saints, Bluebird, C.O.G., Coldwater, Computer Chess, Enough Said, Fruitvale Station, A Glimpse Inside the Mind of Charles Swan III, Hide Your Smiling Faces, Kill Your Darlings, Prince Avalanche, The Spectacular Now, Starlet, Sweetwater and Trust Me. The American Indie Competition of 2013 was won by Short Term 12.

2014 American Indie Competition
The 2014 edition lasted 10 days, screened 87 films, from 28 countries. On October 4, the lineup for the 2014 American Indie Competition was announced on the website of LIFF. The competing films were: Camp X-Ray, The Disappearance of Eleanor Rigby: Her, The Disappearance of Eleanor Rigby: Him, Gabriël, The Heart Machine, Imperial Dreams, Listen Up Philip, Love is Strange, The One I Love, Sequoia, The Skeleton Twins, Summer of Blood, The Well, Whiplash, White Bird in a Blizzard, Wish I Was Here and The Young Kieslowski.

2015 American Indie Competition 
The lineup for the 2015 American Indie Competition was announced on October 5. The competing films were: Mistress America, The End of the Tour, Consumed, Cronies, Houses, Results, Me and Earl and the Dying Girl, Cop Car, Z for Zachariah, Rosewater, Tangerine and The Gift.

2016 American Indie Competition 
On October 7, the lineup for the 2016 American Indie Competition was announced on the LIFF website. Films in competition this year are: First Girl I Loved, Lovesong, From Nowhere, Born to Be Blue, Swiss Army Man, Goat, American Pastoral, Transpecos, As You Are, Kicks, Joshy and Burn Your Maps. Additionally in 2016, an album called Sitting Through Credits, based on the competition, was made by Dutch artist Moon Moon Moon and was launched during the festival.

2018 American Indie Competition 
On October 5, the lineup for the 2018 American Indie Competition was announced on the LIFF website. Films in competition this year are: Eighth Grade, The Kindergarten Teacher, Blaze, Damsel, Leave No Trace, Love After Love, Cam, American Animals, The Miseducation of Cameron Post and Diane, Her Smell, Wildlife and Thunder Road.

2019 American Indie Competition 
On October 6, the lineup for the 2019 American Indie Competition was announced on the LIFF website. Films in competition this year are: The Farewell, To the Stars (film), Luce (film), The Death of Dick Long, The Friend, The Peanut Butter Falcon, Lucky Grandma and Seberg.

Panorama
LIFF's Panorama program screens films from all over the world. Some films that were screened during the Panorama program include Amour, Argo, The Artist, Burn After Reading, Children of Men, Drive, Gone Baby Gone, Das Weiße Band, We Need To Talk About Kevin, You Will Meet a Tall Dark Stranger, 50/50, La grande bellezza, Inside Llewyn Davis, Mommy, Youth, I, Daniel Blake, Lion, The Birth of a Nation and Everybody Wants Some!!.

During the 2016 edition, the Audience Award was won by Toni Erdmann.

Side program
Besides the American Indie and Panorama programs, the LIFF also hosts special screenings at locations like St Peter's Church (Pieterkerk) and the Rijksmuseum van Oudheden. In 2013, the festival hosted a grand opening in the church with two Charlie Chaplin films, accompanied by live music from composer Timothy Brock.

One of the most important aspects of the side programming is the Science & Cinema program, combining cinema with contributions from Leiden University.

Attendance, opening films and prize winners

European Network for Independent American Cinema

In 2014, LIFF launched the European Network for Independent American Cinema in collaboration with the American Film Festival in Poland. Its mission is to promote American Independent productions throughout Europe. The Network works to fulfil this mission through its film festival members in Europe and its supporting partners in Asia and North America.

All the participating film festivals are platforms for American independent films in their respective regions. They all work closely within the Network, but embody diversity and individual artistic identity, through their distinct programming choices. They feature both press and audience screenings and offer a side events including classes, conferences and industry pitching, bringing together a wide spectrum of viewers an industry professionals to share experiences and knowledge.

See also
 Leiden International Short Film Festival

References

External links

Official announcement of the American Indie Competition in Filmmaker Magazine.
Interview with LIFF director Alexander Mouret
Withoutabox

Film festivals in the Netherlands
Culture in Leiden